Juan Pablo Toro Jara (born 19 October 1976), known as Juan Pablo Toro, is a Chilean former footballer who played as centre-back.

He played for clubs like Universidad de Concepción and Unión Española.

Honours

Club
Universidad de Concepción
 Tercera División de Chile (1): 1997

Deportes Temuco
 Primera B (1): 2001

Unión Española
 Primera División de Chile (1): 2005 Apertura

References
 

1976 births
Living people
People from Cachapoal Province
Chilean footballers
Universidad de Concepción footballers
Deportes Temuco footballers
Unión Española footballers
Ñublense footballers
Unión Temuco footballers
Deportes Colchagua footballers
Chilean Primera División players
Primera B de Chile players
Tercera División de Chile players
Association football central defenders